Do You Want More?!!!??! is the second studio album by American hip hop band The Roots, released January 17, 1995 on DGC Records. The band's major label-debut, it was released two years after their independent debut album, Organix (1993). Do You Want More?!!!??! has been considered by critics as a classic of hip hop jazz. In 1998, the album was selected as one of The Sources 100 Best Rap Albums. On November 2, 2015, twenty years after its release, the album was certified Gold by the Recording Industry Association of America for shipments of 500,000 units in the United States. The master tapes for the album, including some unreleased tracks, were destroyed in the 2008 Universal Studios fire.

Track listing 

The track listing on some album releases denotes the first track, "Intro/There's Something Goin' On," as track #18, continuing the track count from Organix (17 tracks). The rest of the tracks continue upward from 18 to "The Unlocking" (being track #33)

Charts

Weekly charts

Year-end charts

References 

Works cited

External links
 Do You Want More?!!!??! at Discogs
 Back to the Roots at Jam!
 No Boundaries for Roots of Philly at Los Angeles Times

1995 albums
The Roots albums
Albums produced by Questlove
Albums produced by Scott Storch
DGC Records albums
Albums recorded at Sigma Sound Studios